Olamide Gbenga Adedeji (born 15 March 1989) is a Nigerian rapper, singer, songwriter, and record executive. Widely regarded as one of the biggest and most influential artists in Africa, he has been instrumental to the launching of the careers of several Afrobeats music stars. He records in Yoruba and English. In 2011, he released his debut studio album Rapsodi while signed to Coded Tunes. YBNL, his follow-up album, was released under his label imprint "Yahoo Boy No Laptop," aka YBNL Nation. The album was supported by the singles "First of All," "Voice of the Street," "Stupid Love," and "Ilefo Illuminati." On 7 November 2013, he released his third studio album Baddest Guy Ever Liveth. The album's singles include "Durosoke" and "Yemi My Lover." On 17 July 2013, Olamide became the first Nigerian to sign an endorsement deal with Cîroc.

Early life and musical beginnings 
Olamide Gbenga Adedeji was born in Bariga, Lagos State, on 15 March 1989. He is the second of three children of Pa Adedeji and his second wife, Ronke Osisanya Adedeji. Olamide has two siblings, TemmyGold and Eniola Olamilekan (who is also known as DJ Enimoney).

Olamide started his career when he released the debut single, "Eni Duro," in 2010. In the same year, he performed at The Hip Hop World Awards. He studied mass communication at Tai Solarin University but dropped out due to financial problems.

Adedeji is married to Adebukunmi Aisha Suleiman.They have two boys together, Batifeori Maximilliano Adedeji and Tunrepin Myles Adedeji. Olamide allegedly had a love child with Maria Okanrende, who at the time worked at The Beat 99.9 FM

Music career 
He was signed to ID Cabasa's Coded Tunes record label and was managed by Toni Payne. In 2012, he left Coded Tunes and started his own record label YBNL Nation.

2011: Rapsodi 
Olamide's debut album, Rapsodi was released in 2011. Its lead single, "Omo To Shan," charted on several radio stations in Lagos and across Nigeria. Olamide's debut offering led to collaborations with numerous artists, including Wizkid, ID Cabasa, 9ice, Reminisce and D'banj.

2012: YBNL 
Adedeji's second studio album YBNL was released in November 2012. Its production was handled by Tyrone, Samklef, 2 Kriss, Pheelz and ID Cabasa. The album features guest appearances from Davido, Tiwa Savage, Kayswitch, Dammy Krane, Reminisce, Samklef, Buckwylla, Minus 2 and Base One. It was supported by the singles "Ilefo Illuminati", "First of All", "Stupid Love" and "Voice of the Street".

2013: Baddest Guy Ever Liveth 
Baddest Guy Ever Liveth is Olamide's third studio album. It was released on 7 November 2013 by YBNL Nation. Olamide recorded the album between 2012 and 2013 and enlisted Pheelz, Buckwyla, Ketchup, Ice Prince, Pepenazi, Endia, Viktoh, B.Banks, Phyno, Pele Pele and Bez to appear as guest artists on it. The album was produced entirely by Pheelz, except for the thirteenth track, "Sitting on the Throne."

Baddest Guy Ever Liveth was supported by four singles: "Durosoke," "Turn Up," "Yemi My Lover" and "Eleda Mi O." Premium Times newspaper included the album on its list of the five yet to be released Nigerian albums of 2013. It was ranked 12th on Afrikka Radio's list of the top 12 best Nigerian albums of 2013. Baddest Guy Ever Liveth won Best Album of the Year at the 2014 Nigeria Entertainment Awards, and was nominated for Rap Album of the Year at the 2014 City People Entertainment Awards. It won Best Rap Album and Album of the Year at The Headies 2014.

In May 2013, it was reported that Olamide had signed a record deal with DB Records. Olamide took to Twitter to debunk the reports. In an interview with Toolz on NdaniTV's The Juice, he said that it was "too late" for anyone to sign him.

2014: Street OT 
On 14 November 2014, Olamide released his fourth album Street OT through YBNL Nation. The album is a follow up to his 2013 Baddest Guy Ever Liveth album. Preceded by the singles titled "Story for the Gods" and "Goons Mi," Street OT features guest appearances from Pasuma, Lil Kesh, Chinko Ekun, Phyno, Don Jazzy, and Reminisce. Its production was handled by Pheelz, B-Banks, and Young Jonn. The ideology of the title of the album is to glorify and show his love for the "streets," a word with which Olamide is synonymous with.

2015: 2 Kings and Eyan Mayweather 
Olamide collaborated with Phyno in 2015 to release 2 Kings. It was released through Cloud 9 and the iTunes Store with a little announcement on 1 April 2015 by Penthauze Music and YBNL Nation. The album features collaborations with producers and guest artists such as Wizkid, Lil Kesh, Storm Rex, Pheelz, Major Bangz, B.Banks and Young John. Prior to recording the album, Olamide and Phyno frequently collaborated with each other on several songs, including "Ghost Mode" and "Dope Money." The album produced the singles "Une" and "Confam Ni," both of which were released in the months leading to the album's release.

Olamide's fifth studio album Eyan Mayweather was released on 23 November 2015. Released through YBNL Nation with studio production from Pheelz, Young Jonn, B Banks and I.D. Cabasa, Eyan Mayweather is the follow up to 2 Kings, a collaborative album by Olamide and Phyno. The album boasted of having 21 tracks with no single feature.

2016: The Glory 
The Glory, Olamide's sixth studio album, was released on December 23, 2016. It was released through YBNL Nation with studio production from Pheelz. The Album contains 16 back-to-back tracks with features from artists like Phyno, Wande Coal, Burna Boy, Akuchi and Davolee. The Glory is the follow-up to Eyan Mayweather.

2020: 999 EP, joint venture deal with Empire and Carpe Diem 
On 10 February 2020, Olamide released a surprise project, the EP 999 tooXclusive rated the project 6/10, while Motolani Alake of Pulse gave a 5.5/10 review.

Olamide revealed to the public on 18 February 2020 that his record label, YBNL Nation, has signed a joint venture deal with an international distribution company Empire. He further stated that Fireboy DML and any new artist signed to YBNL Nation will join him to benefit from the deal.
Olamide's eleventh album Carpe Diem was released on 8 October 2020. Carpe Diem contains 12 tracks and features Omah Lay, Fireboy DML, Peruzzi, Bad Boy Timz, Bella Shmurda and Phyno, with production credits to Young John, Pheelz, P.Priime, ID Cabasa and VStix.

2021: UY Scuti 
Olamide announced on 16 March 2021 that he was done working on another album. On 18 April, he announced the album UY Scuti, which was released on 18 June. Olamide mentioned that his son was the inspiration on why he titled the album UY Scuti.

On 5 February 2022, Olamide hinted at retirement after the release of his 12th studio album.

Discography

Studio albums 
Rapsodi (2011)
YBNL (2012)
Baddest Guy Ever Liveth (2013)
Street OT (2014)
Eyan Mayweather (2015)
The Glory (2016)
Lagos Nawa (2017)
Carpe Diem (2020)
UY Scuti (2021)
Unruly (TBA)

Collaborative albums and EPs 
2 Kings (with Phyno) (2015)
YBNL (feet Mafia Family) (2018)
999 (with Penthauze Music, Phyno, Check и Rhatti) (2020)
BADDER DAN DEM (feet Jahborne) (2013)

Awards and nominations

See also 
List of Nigerian musicians
List of Nigerian rappers

References

External links 

Nigerian male rappers
21st-century Nigerian male singers
1989 births
Living people
Yoruba musicians
Rappers from Lagos
Nigerian hip hop singers
The Headies winners
Nigerian music industry executives
Yoruba-language singers
YBNL Nation artists